F-flat major (or the key of F-flat) is a theoretical key based on F, consisting of the pitches F, G, A, B, C, D, and E Its key signature has six flats and one double flat.

The F-flat major scale is:

Its relative minor is D-flat minor, usually replaced by C-sharp minor (see reason below) and its parallel minor is F-flat minor, usually replaced by E minor, since F-flat minor's four double-flats make it generally impractical to use. Because of that, it is usually enharmonic to E major with 4 sharps.

Music in F-flat major 
Although F-flat major is usually notated as its enharmonic equivalent of E major, because E major has four sharps only as opposed to F-flat major's eight flats (including the B), part of Richard Strauss' Metamorphosen uses F-flat major, which one commentator has called "a bitter enharmonic parody" of the earlier manifestations of E major in the piece.

Beethoven also used F-flat major in his Piano Sonata No. 31, Op. 110. In the first movement's exposition, the transitional passage between the first and second subjects consists of arpeggiated figuration beginning in A-flat major and modulating to the dominant key of E-flat major.  In the recapitulation, the key for this passage is changed to bring the second subject back in A-flat major: the transitional passage appears in a key that would theoretically be F-flat major, but which is notated in E major, presumably because Beethoven judged this easier to read – this key being a major third below the key of the earlier appearance of this passage. Likewise, the second movement (in A-flat major) of Beethoven's  Piano Sonata No. 8 (Pathétique) contains six measures of what would theoretically be F-flat major, but notated as E major (keeping the 4-flat key signature of the movement, so every note in the passage has an accidental).

Another example of F-flat major being notated as E major can be found in the Adagio of Haydn's Trio No. 27 in A-flat major. The Finale of Bruckner's Symphony No. 4 employs enharmonic E for F-flat, but its coda employs F-flat directly, with a Phrygian cadence through F-flat onto the tonic.

An example of F-flat major being used directly is in Victor Ewald's Quintet No. 4 in A-flat major (Op. 8), where the entirety of the third movement is notated in this key.

The climax that occurs in the middle of Samuel Barber's Adagio for Strings resolves to F-flat major. The final cadence of John Rutter's setting of Robert Herrick's poem "What Sweeter Music" is in F-flat major.

In Bach's Prelude and Fugue in E-flat minor, a brief section in bar 26 of the piece modulates to F-flat major.

References

Musical keys
Major scales